Sar Ab-e Barnaj (also Romanized as Sar Āb-e Barnāj and Sarāb-e Barnāj) is a village in Cham Chamal Rural District, Bisotun District, Harsin County, Kermanshah Province, Iran. At the 2006 census, its population was 80, in 18 families.

References 

Populated places in Harsin County